The Hit Parade was an early Australian television pop music series which aired on  the Seven Network's HSV-7 from 1956 to 1959. It is often mentioned in books discussing Australian television of the 1950s.

The series presented hit recordings, which were danced to and lip-synced by the cast ("The Hit Paraders"), often presenting the songs in settings with sets and costumes (anticipating the music video). Over 20 episodes of this series are held by National Film and Sound Archive, along with a few episodes of These Were the Hits, a similar series.

See also
The Dotty Mack Show - U.S. series in which popular recordings were lip-synced by cast

References

External links

Seven Network original programming
1956 Australian television series debuts
1959 Australian television series endings
Black-and-white Australian television shows
English-language television shows
Australian music television series
Pop music television series
Dance television shows